Christine (titled onscreen as John Carpenter's Christine) is a 1983 American supernatural horror film directed by John Carpenter and starring Keith Gordon, John Stockwell, Alexandra Paul, Robert Prosky and Harry Dean Stanton. The film also features supporting performances from Roberts Blossom and Kelly Preston.

Written by Bill Phillips and based on Stephen King's 1983 novel of the same name, the movie follows the changes in the lives of Arnie Cunningham, his friends, his family, and his teenage enemies after he buys a classic red and white 1958 Plymouth Fury (for $250) named Christine, license plate CQB 241, a car that seems to have a mind of its own and a jealous, possessive personality, which has a bad influence on Arnie.

Released in the United States on December 9, 1983, Christine received generally positive reviews from critics and grossed $21 million at the box office. The film has since become a cult classic. A remake from Sony Pictures and Blumhouse is in development.

Plot
A red and white 1958 Plymouth Fury is built on the assembly line. The car injures one worker by slamming its hood shut on his hand; when another one sits in the driver's seat and flicks cigar ashes onto the upholstery, he is subsequently found dead. Twenty years later, nerdy teenager Arnold "Arnie" Cunningham buys the now-decrepit Fury over the objections of his friend, Dennis Guilder. At school, Arnie is bullied by Buddy Repperton and his gang, and Buddy is expelled after threatening Arnie with a switchblade. Defying his parents, Arnie begins to restore the Fury (named "Christine" by its previous owner) at a garage/junkyard owned by Will Darnell. Arnie's appearance and personality begin to change as he works; he sheds his glasses, dresses better, and develops an air of cocky arrogance. His obsession with Christine puts a strain on his relationship with his parents and his friendship with Dennis.

Dennis learns from the seller that the Fury's previous owner was also obsessed with Christine, that his daughter choked to death in the car, and that he and his wife both committed suicide in it. An attractive new student, Leigh Cabot, attends one of Dennis' football games with Arnie; Dennis sees them together and notes that Christine is now fully restored. Distracted, he suffers a severe injury that puts him in the hospital and ends his high school football career. Arnie and Leigh begin a relationship, but Leigh becomes uncomfortable sitting in Christine as the two watch a drive-in movie. The car's radio turns on by itself as Leigh begins to choke on her food, and Arnie finds the doors locked. Leigh eventually frees herself, and another patron administers the Heimlich maneuver to save her life. 

Buddy and his gang vandalize Christine in retaliation for Buddy's expulsion. Arnie is so distraught that he angrily breaks up with Leigh when she tries to console him. Once he returns Christine to the garage, he is surprised to see it gradually and completely repair itself. Christine chases down one member of Buddy's gang that evening and kills him, repairing itself again afterward. Police detective Rudy Junkins questions Arnie about the death, but lets him go once Arnie provides an alibi. Later, Christine targets the rest of the gang, killing two members at a gas station and then fatally running Buddy down. The badly damaged car returns to Darnell's garage on its own; when he sits in the driver's seat, Christine kills him by pushing it forward to crush him against the steering wheel. By the time the police find the body, Christine is once more in like-new condition. Junkins again questions Arnie, who becomes angry and gives an alibi. 

Leigh asks for Dennis' help to destroy Christine and save Arnie. They plan to lure Christine to the garage and smash it with a bulldozer, but Christine surprises them by emerging from a pile of scrap metal. Leigh flees while Dennis battles Christine, now being driven by Arnie; in an attempt to run Leigh down, Christine crashes into Darnell's office and Arnie is thrown through the windshield, fatally impaling himself on broken glass. Christine continues to attack, repairing itself more quickly than before, until Dennis and Leigh flatten it with the bulldozer. 

The next day, Dennis, Leigh, and Junkins watch as the remains of Christine are crushed at the junkyard. Junkins congratulates the teens for stopping Christine, but they regret not being able to save Arnie. The sound of a 1950s rock and roll song spooks them, but it proves to be coming from a boombox carried by a junkyard worker. Christine's front grill twitches slightly.

Cast
 Keith Gordon as Arnie Cunningham, a nerdy boy who bought Christine.
 John Stockwell as Dennis Guilder, a former football player after injuries and Arnie's best friend.
 Alexandra Paul as Leigh Cabot, a friend of Dennis who broke up with Arnie.
 Robert Prosky as Will Darnell, the owner of his garage.
 Harry Dean Stanton as Detective Rudy Junkins, a detective.
 Christine Belford as Regina Cunningham, Arnie's stern mother.
 Roberts Blossom as George LeBay, whose brother formerly owned Christine.
 William Ostrander as Clarence "Buddy" Repperton, a bully.
 David Spielberg as Mr. Casey, the principal of the school who expels Buddy for drawing his switchblade.
 Malcolm Danare as Peter "Moochie" Welch, one of Buddy's friends.
 Steven Tash as Richie Trelawney, one of Buddy's friends.
 Stuart Charno as Don Vandenberg, one of Buddy's friends.
 Kelly Preston as Roseanne, a great friend of Dennis.
 Robert Darnell as Michael Cunningham, Arnie's stern father.
 Jack Faust as a referee who disqualifies Dennis from injuries.

Production

Conception
Producer Richard Kobritz had previously produced the miniseries Salem's Lot, also based on a Stephen King novel. Through producing the miniseries, Kobritz became acquainted with King, who sent him manuscripts of two of his novels, Cujo, and Christine. Kobritz purchased the rights to Christine after finding himself attracted to the novel's "celebration of America's obsession with the motorcar."

Kobritz's first choice for director was John Carpenter, who was initially unavailable owing to two projects: an adaptation of another King novel, Firestarter, and an adaptation of the 1980 Eric Van Lustbader novel The Ninja. However, production delays on these projects allowed Carpenter to accept the director position for Christine. Kobritz and Carpenter had previously collaborated in the 1978 television film Someone's Watching Me!. Bill Phillips was Carpenter's choice for writer and was brought on shortly after Carpenter arrived. Carpenter was also joined by special effects supervisor Roy Arbogast, who had previously worked with Carpenter in The Thing (1982). According to Carpenter, Christine was not a film he had planned on directing, saying that he directed the film as "a job" as opposed to a "personal project." He had previously directed The Thing, which had done poorly at the box office and led to critical backlash. In retrospect, Carpenter stated that upon reading Christine, he felt that "It just wasn't very frightening. But it was something I needed to do at that time for my career."

King's novel, the source material for Carpenter's film, made it clear that the car was possessed by the evil spirit of its previous owner, Roland D. LeBay, whereas the film version of the story shows that the evil spirit of the car manifested itself on the day it was built. Other elements from the novel were altered for the film, particularly the execution of the death scenes, which the filmmakers opted for a more "cinematic approach."

Casting
Initially, Columbia Pictures had wanted to cast Brooke Shields in the role of Leigh because of her publicity after the release of The Blue Lagoon (1981), and Scott Baio as Arnie. The filmmakers declined the suggestion, opting to cast young actors who were still fairly unknown. Kevin Bacon auditioned for the role, but opted out when offered the lead in Footloose (1984). Carpenter cast Keith Gordon in the role of Arnie after an audition in New York City; Gordon had some experience in film, and was also working in theater at the time; John Stockwell was cast at an audition in Los Angeles.

Nineteen-year-old Alexandra Paul was cast in the film after an audition in New York City; according to Carpenter, Paul was an "untrained, young actress" at the time, but brought a "great quality" about the character of Leigh. According to Paul, she had not read any of King's books or seen Carpenter's films, and read the novel in preparation.

Filming
Christine was shot largely in Los Angeles, California, while the location for Darnell's garage was located in Santa Clarita. Filming began in April 1983, mere days after the King novel had been published. An abandoned furniture factory in Irwindale was used for the opening scene. The film's stunts were primarily completed by stunt coordinator Terry Leonard, who was behind the wheel of the car during the high-speed chase scenes, as well as the scene in which the car drives down a highway engulfed in flames. During that scene, Leonard wore a Nomex firefighter's suit complete with breathing apparatus.

Alexandra Paul's identical twin sister Caroline Paul wrote that she and her sister pulled a prank during filming, sending Caroline on set in place of Alexandra without telling Carpenter that they had made the switch until after he had shot a scene. She wrote, "My highly skilled clutch-pushing actually made it into the movie."

The car
Although the car in the film is identified as a 1958 Plymouth Fury – and in 1983 radio ads promoting the film, voiceover artists announced, "she's a '57 Fury" – two other Plymouth models, the Belvedere and the Savoy, were also used to portray the malevolent automobile onscreen. John Carpenter placed ads throughout Southern California searching for models of the car, and was able to purchase twenty-four of them in various states of disrepair, which were used to build a total of seventeen copies of the film car. All cars were two door hardtops.

Total production for the 1958 Plymouth Fury was only 5,303, and they were difficult to find and expensive to buy at the time. In addition, the real-life Furys only came in one color, "Sandstone White" with a "Buckskin Beige" interior, seen on the other Furys on the assembly line during the initial scenes of the movie, though the car in King's novel was ordered with a red-and-white custom paint job. The original Furys had anodized gold trim on the body and Fury script on the rear fender. In order to bypass the problem of obtaining the rare trim, the cars featured the more common Belvedere "Dartline" trim. Several vehicles were destroyed during filming, but most of the cars were Savoy and Belvedere models dressed to look like the Fury. At least one '57 Savoy was used, its front end modified to look like a '58.

Some of King's details about the car were incorrect in the novel. The 1956-1958 Plymouth Fury was only available as a two-door coupe, while the book described it as a four-door sedan, which would have made it a Savoy or Belvedere model. During Leigh's choking scene, Christine is shown to have common vertical lock "buttons" on the inside door panels. Chrysler vehicles of this era were not equipped with such buttons. To lock the door, the door handle has to be pushed downward. King also mentions a shift lever for the automatic transmission, but in real life it had push-button controls.

Originally, Carpenter had not planned to film the car's regeneration scenes, but gave special effects supervisor Roy Arbogast three weeks to devise a way for the car to rebuild itself. Arbogast and his team made rubber molds from one of the cars, including a whole front end. One of the cars was stripped of its engine to accommodate internally-mounted hydraulics that pulled the framework inward, crumpling the car, with the shot then run backwards in the final film.

Twenty-three cars were used in the film. Initially sold as scrap metal after filming ended, one of the best known surviving vehicles was eventually rescued from the junkyard and restored. It was subsequently bought by collector Bill Gibson of Pensacola, Florida.

One of the Christines was auctioned off at an auto-auction in Florida in January 2020.

Release

Box office
Christine was released in North America on December 9, 1983, to 1,045 theaters.

In its opening weekend Christine brought in $3,408,904 landing at #4. The film dropped 39.6% in its second weekend, grossing $2,058,517 slipping from fourth to eighth place. In its third weekend, it grossed $1,851,909 dropping to #9. The film remained at #9 its fourth weekend, grossing $2,736,782. In its fifth weekend, it returned to #8, grossing $2,015,922. Bringing in $1,316,835 in its sixth weekend, the film dropped out of the box office top ten to twelfth place. In its seventh and final weekend, the film brought in $819,972 landing at #14, bringing the total gross for Christine to $21,017,849.

Critical response
On the review aggregator website Rotten Tomatoes, Christine holds a 70% approval rating based on 30 reviews, with an average rating of 6/10. The consensus reads: "The cracks are starting to show in John Carpenter's directorial instincts, but Christine is nonetheless silly, zippy fun.”

Roger Ebert gave the movie three out of four stars, saying: "by the end of the movie, Christine has developed such a formidable personality that we are actually taking sides during its duel with a bulldozer. This is the kind of movie where you walk out with a silly grin, get in your car, and lay rubber halfway down the Eisenhower." Janet Maslin of The New York Times gave the film a middling review, saying: "The early parts of the film are engaging and well acted, creating a believable high-school atmosphere. Unfortunately, the later part of the film is slow in developing, and it unfolds in predictable ways." Variety gave the film a negative review, stating: "Christine seems like a retread. This time it's a fire-engine red, 1958 Plymouth Fury that's possessed by the Devil, and this deja-vu premise [from the novel by Stephen King] combined with the crazed-vehicle format, makes Christine appear pretty shop worn." Time Out said of the film: "Carpenter and novelist Stephen King share not merely a taste for genre horror but a love of '50's teenage culture; and although set in the present, Christine reflects the second taste far more effectively than the first."

In 2023, John Carpenter reflected on the movie:“I love my cast in that movie. Keith Gordon was fabulous, and Alexandra Paul was… I believe she’d been a model, and she’s just a terrific actress. And the great character actor Harry Dean Stanton was on that. Harry Dean is quite a character, I really loved him. But it was a fun movie to make and easy — nothing tough about it. And it did OK, you know, it opened alright. So people were kind, which is nice.“

Home media
The film was released on VHS by Columbia Pictures, a DVD came out on August 4, 1998, and later as a special edition DVD in 2004. On March 12, 2013, Twilight Time video released the film on Blu-ray for the first time in a limited edition run numbered at 3,000 copies. On September 29, 2015, Sony Pictures Home Entertainment re-released the film on Blu-ray. The film was released on 4K UHD Blu-ray on September 11, 2018.

Soundtrack
Two soundtracks were released, one consisting purely of the music written and composed by John Carpenter and Alan Howarth, the other consisting of the contemporary pop songs used in the film.

Score

Songs appearing in film
The soundtrack album containing songs used in the film was entitled Christine: Original Motion Picture Soundtrack and was released on LP and cassette on Motown Records. It contained 10 (of the 15) songs listed in the film's credits, plus one track from John Carpenter and Alan Howarth's own score. The track listing was as follows:
 George Thorogood and the Destroyers – "Bad to the Bone"
 Buddy Holly & the Crickets – "Not Fade Away"
 Johnny Ace – "Pledging My Love"
 Robert & Johnny – "We Belong Together"
 Little Richard – "Keep A-Knockin'"
 Dion and The Belmonts – "I Wonder Why"
 The Viscounts – "Harlem Nocturne"
 Thurston Harris – "Little Bitty Pretty One"
 Danny & The Juniors – "Rock 'n' Roll is Here to Stay"
 John Carpenter & Alan Howarth – "Christine Attacks (Plymouth Fury)"
 Larry Williams – "Bony Moronie"

The following tracks were not included on this LP release, but were used in the film and listed in the film's credits:

 ABBA – "The Name of the Game"
 Bonnie Raitt – "Runaway"
 Ritchie Valens – "Come on, Let's Go"
 Tanya Tucker – "Not Fade Away"
 The Rolling Stones – "Beast of Burden"

Remake
In June 2021, Sony Pictures Entertainment and Blumhouse Productions announced the development of a remake of the film with Bryan Fuller penning the script and directing and Jason Blum, Vincenzo Natali and Steve Hoban producing.

Cultural references
 The film is referred to in the song Autopilot by Allison Ponthier.

See also
 List of films about automobiles

References

Bibliography

External links

 
 
 

1983 films
1983 horror films
1980s horror thriller films
1980s mystery films
1980s supernatural films
1980s teen horror films
1980s teen romance films
American horror thriller films
American mystery thriller films
American romantic thriller films
American supernatural horror films
American supernatural thriller films
American teen horror films
American teen romance films
Columbia Pictures films
Films about automobiles
Films based on American horror novels
Films based on urban legends
Films based on works by Stephen King
Films directed by John Carpenter
Films scored by John Carpenter
Films scored by Alan Howarth (composer)
Films set in 1957
Films set in 1978
Films set in California
Films set in Detroit
Films shot in Los Angeles
American mystery horror films
Phantom vehicles
American romantic horror films
Teen mystery films
1980s romantic thriller films
Films about curses
1980s English-language films
1980s American films